The Lincoln Stars are a Tier I junior ice hockey team playing in the United States Hockey League (USHL). The Stars' home ice is the Ice Box on the former Nebraska State Fair grounds and adjacent to the University of Nebraska–Lincoln.

History
With prompting of Lincoln realtor Mark Claydon, who spear-headed an effort to build the city's first and only indoor ice arena, the Stars came to Lincoln in 1996. Led by Derek Reynolds and future NHL player Josh Langfeld, the Stars posted a 40–13–1 regular season record, the best expansion season in USHL history. The Stars continued their domination through the playoffs, losing just two playoff games en route to winning the Clark Cup. Every game was sold out at the 4,231-seat Ice Box. The success continued through the following seasons; the Stars sold out every home game until early 2002. In 1998, the Ice Box was expanded to 5,010 seats in preparation for the USA Hockey National Championships (Junior A). The capacity was later reduced to 4,610, as some bleacher seats were converted to club seating.

The Stars made the playoffs their first seven seasons and won a second Clark Cup in 2003. Led by players such as Danny Irmen, the Stars defeated the rival Omaha Lancers in the Clark Cup finals. After the 2003 championship, they missed the playoffs for the first time and attendance started to steadily decrease. From the 2003–04 to 2012–13 seasons, the team qualified for the playoffs eight times and advanced past the second round once.

In 2013, the Stars were sold to Chicago-based businessman Ryan Schiff. The team failed to make the playoffs seven out of the next nine completed seasons; the 2019–20 USHL season was curtailed by the onset of the COVID-19 pandemic.

On June 3, 2021, it was announced the team had been sold to Alberto Fernandez, the owner of both the North American Hockey League's North Iowa Bulls, a franchise that he had owned as the Amarillo Bulls since 2019, and the North American 3 Hockey League's Mason City Toros, a team that used to be called the North Iowa Bulls and had won the league championship four times. Fernandez then brought over the Amarillo Bulls head coach, Rocky Russo, to be the head coach for the Stars.

Season records

Coaches
Steve Johnson (1996–2007)
Jim McGroarty (2007–2010, 2013–2014)
Chad Johnson (2010–2013)
Mick Berge (interim, 2014)
Chris Hartsburg (2014–2017)
Cody Chupp (2017–2020)
Chris Michael (2020–2021)
Rocky Russo (2021–present)

Alumni
Notable Stars alumni includes Brandon Bochenski (Tampa Bay Lightning), Andy Schneider (Pittsburgh Penguins organization), David Backes (Boston Bruins), Josh Langfeld (San Jose Sharks), Jared Boll (Columbus Blue Jackets), Evan Rankin (Syracuse Crunch), Erik Condra (Ottawa Senators) and Brandon Bollig (Chicago Blackhawks - NHL Stanley Cup Champions).

Lincoln players have also made names for themselves in the NCAA Championship Game.  Three former Stars have scored championship-winning overtime goals:  Josh Langfeld (University of Michigan—1998 vs. Boston College), Grant Potulny (University of Minnesota—2002 vs. University of Maine) and Colby Cohen (Boston University—2009 vs. Miami University).

Roster
As of September 21, 2022.

|}

References

External links
Lincoln Stars

United States Hockey League teams
Sports in Lincoln, Nebraska
Ice hockey teams in Nebraska
1996 establishments in Nebraska
Ice hockey clubs established in 1996